Horse and Bamboo Theatre or Horse + Bamboo Theatre is a British theatre company founded in 1978 by Bob Frith. The company works using masks and visual, puppet, physical, music-based forms rather than text. It works internationally as well as from The Boo in Waterfoot, Rossendale, Lancashire, UK. Since 2012 the emphasis of its work has been increasingly in serving its local community, and much of its work was under 'The Boo' name, until the venue was ‘de-branded’ to ‘Horse and Bamboo’ in 2022.

Origins 
 Frith taught in the early 1970s at Manchester School of Art (later Manchester Metropolitan University). Unhappy with the prevailing abstraction of the period he experimented with extending purely visual forms to include live performance and music, influenced by Allan Kaprow, Red Grooms and Claes Oldenburg, and working with groups of his students. At the Bede Gallery, Jarrow, he worked on a large-scale project with his friend Dave Pearson, filmmakers and artists, and including the musician Alan Price, as well as engineers from the local shipbuilding industry.

In the mid 70s he met Welfare State and worked with that company for two years. He formed Horse + Bamboo Theatre in 1978, with a group of ex-students, musicians and members of Matrogoth Theatre from Leiden, Netherlands.

After 2000 Frith worked closely with Alison Duddle, originally of In the Heart of the Beast Puppet and Mask Theatre from Minneapolis on the majority of the company's productions.  In late 2016 Duddle left the company, and Frith retired in March 2018, although continuing to work with Apna Rossendale (see Different Moons, below).

Name 
The name derives from the use of horses to pull a caravan of vehicles when touring, which was a central feature of the company's work from 1979 to 1999. This grew from their commitment to taking their work to rural communities, and using the horses and horse-drawn wagons to attract an audience. Bamboo, due to its lightness and strength, was the main structural timber used in the early horse-drawn touring sets, and was also used to make puppets and music instruments.

Horse + Bamboo now tours in a more conventional manner, but its roots in rural touring are maintained through tours with small, flexible shows that lend themselves to community venues, and the development of the Boo, that serves as a centre and venue for the company's local community in Pennine Lancashire. In this regard Horse + Bamboo has much in common with Kneehigh Theatre, who maintain a locally based presence in Cornwall in addition to their wider touring work.

The company is based in a building in Waterfoot, Rossendale, Lancashire, originally the Liberal Club, but which is now called 'The Boo'. This was the name, a diminutive form of 'Horse and Bamboo', by which the company was commonly known locally. The Boo was renamed Horse and Bamboo in 2022, however.

Productions 
Horse + Bamboo Theatre creates its own material, occasionally in collaboration with other artists and writers, with the majority of its productions made by the core team of artists. Its hallmark is in creating sustained theatrical narratives without the use of dialogue, as well as the use of full-head masks and puppetry. Film, music and dance are often integrated within the company's productions.

The work that they create is uncompromising in terms of artistry and subject matter. The artistic directors Bob Frith and Alison Duddle create work to which they bring the passion of great artists - emotionally powerful, beautiful to look at, laced with humour and pathos that reaches out to audiences, and one more thing that is quite difficult to describe. It is a roughness, an absence of slick polish and finish in the design. A deliberate roughing of the edges which contrasts with the beautiful precision of the performance and the soundscoring. Watching and being involved in a Horse and Bamboo performance, we as the audience aren't allowed to forget that this is an event that is being hewed from the wood, metal, paper, cloth, paint and bodies of flesh and blood in front of our eyes. It brings the moment into focus for us.

Horse and Bamboo isn't a puppetry company, but it does use puppets. From what I've seen, puppets are mixed in for either stylistic or semiotic reasons, or both at the same time.

Touring 
For the first two decades Horse + Bamboo toured using horse-drawn transport. These productions started as outdoor shows, and moved into a marquee after four years. Eventually the company began to create shows that played in village halls and other community centres. The performers walked about 400 miles each season, living in tents and cooking on open fires. Horse-drawn touring took place in England, Scotland, Ireland, Hungary and Slovakia. Now the company tours its productions throughout the UK, and has also toured in Spain, the Netherlands, Germany, and Belgium. For a while the company also used the pPod, a portable structure designed by Magma Architecture which can be set up in 90 minutes and seat up to 35 people. A co-production (with In the Heart of the Beast Puppet and Mask Theatre) of Company of Angels toured the United States between 2003 and 2006. 
Significant Horse + Bamboo Theatre touring productions include The Woodcarver Story(1982); Dance of White Darkness (1994), about Maya Deren in Haiti; Harvest of Ghosts (1999) created with Sam Ukala, the Nigerian playwright; as well as Company of Angels (2002) about the life of Charlotte Salomon.  The company toured an epic production Veil in 2008 that contrasts the lives of two young women, one an Iraqi, the other brought up in Europe, and is set across two generations.

In The Shadow of Trees was written and designed by Bob Frith for the Royal Exchange Theatre Studio in Manchester. Directed by Associate Director, Alison Duddle, it won the Best New Play at the M.E.N. Awards in 2006 and subsequently toured, despite being created especially for the Royal Exchange. Duddle has since adapted and directed a number of other productions aimed at young audiences, including Red Riding Hood and The Nightingale.

In 2009 the company created Little Leap Forward, a production in collaboration with Barefoot Books adapted by Alison Duddle from the book by Guo Yue and Clare Farrow which opened at the Manchester Royal Exchange. Guo Yue created new music for the production that was integrated into the score by Musical Director, Loz Kaye.  They also devised Deep Time Cabaret, part of the 'Valley of Stone' project inspired by the landscape of Rossendale, its geology and industry. The production was unusual for the company in hardly using masks at all, and complex use of projected images and video. In 2012 and again in 2013 the company toured Angus - Weaver of Grass about the Scottish Outsider Artist Angus MacPhee throughout the Hebrides and Highland Regions of Scotland (image to right).

From 2012 onwards the touring programme diminished as a result of changes to arts funding. The emphasis for the company changed to working within the local East Lancashire community, and centred at The Boo. Some touring continued, notably Theatre Ballads which combines live folk music with puppetry and video, and Suffrajitsu, both directed by Esther Ferry-Kennington. The Moonwatcher in 2018 was a collaboration between Bob Frith and the poet Shamshad Khan, that grew out of work with the local South Asian heritage communities, and was the last production involving Bob Frith before he retired from the company.

The Boo 
Horse + Bamboo is based at a building known as The Boo, in Waterfoot, Rossendale which is used as centre and venue for regular arts events and the development of visual theatre. Since 2018, most of the work of the company is under the banner of 'The Boo', rather than 'Horse and Bamboo'. In 2015 the building was renovated and improved, and now has a 110-seat theatre, a studio space, and better facilities for public events. The building is the base for a programme of projects working closely with the local community. The Boo hosts 'Waterfoot Wakes', an annual community festival. The building is also used by other artists and theatre companies both as a place to research and develop new visual theatre work, sometimes in a mentoring partnership with Horse + Bamboo, and as a centre for running their own events and workshops. The Boo has a regular programme of family puppet-based theatre shows, bringing in touring companies. It also hosts live music, film and comedy events.

Horse + Bamboo Theatre has a long history of producing community projects both in its home community of Rossendale, and beyond - for example the Good Friday Parade and Service at Westminster Abbey in 1994 and 1996.

Guided Imagery 
Horse + Bamboo has also been influential in its work with people who have special needs through its Guided Imagery programme. This programme, started in 1982, uses a large-scale built environment and performance space through which small and intimate groups journey, and interact with, a highly sensory environment. These 'performances' last several hours, and are notable in blurring the gap between performer and audience. These productions were precursors to the immersive theatre developed by Punchdrunk and others. Since 2014 the company has utilised many of the techniques developed for this work on a new strand of theatre work for very young children, frequently pre-toddlers.

Different Moons 
In 2013 Horse + Bamboo started a project working with the South Asian community in Rossendale, particularly Haslingden. Funded by the Heritage Lottery Fund, Different Moons initiated a series of interviews with first-generation immigrants from Pakistan and Bangladesh. These were transcribed and the stories told were used as a basis for workshops with the second and third generation South Asian heritage community, particularly young people and women. The project has been led mainly by South Asia artists, particularly Shamshad Khan, the Manchester-based poet. In addition to creative writing the project has created exhibitions, installations, melas, and mushairas with workshops in mehndi, calligraphy and paper-cut arts. In 2015 the company helped open a small meeting place and gallery in Haslingden, called 'Apna' (meaning 'ours' or 'mine' in Urdu), that provides various opportunities for women mainly from Pakistani or Bangladeshi heritage. Apna has become an independent organisation largely supporting South Asian heritage women, based in Haslingden and managed by Arry Nessa and others, although it still retains links with The Boo.

See also
 Bread & Puppet Theater
 Thingumajig Theatre

External links
 Bob Frith Detailed history of the company on the website of its founder.
 Horse + Bamboo Theatre website
 pPod images - Italiano
 pPod images - English

References 

Theatre companies in England
Puppet troupes
Touring theatre
Puppetry in the United Kingdom